Oblik (Serbian Cyrillic: Облик) is a mountain in southern Serbia, near the city of Vranje. Its highest peak Oblik has an elevation of 1,310 meters above sea level. Oblik is part of a larger massif including mountains of Kukavica and Grot.

References

Mountains of Serbia